Karen Kahler is an American actress and voice actress. In 1985, she graduated from Yale University with her bachelor's degree in Geology.

Filmography

Live-Action roles
 113 Degrees - Annora
 Bound for Destiny
 Face
 In This House
 Murder in the West - Mary Paulson
 Necrosis
 Our Own
 Party Like the Rich and Famous - Party Guest
 SamHas7Friends - Fran 
 Stem - Nurse
 The Isolationist - The Maid
 The Hollywood Set - 
 The Magician - The Sister
 True Tales of Terror
 Winky - Beverly

Video game roles
 Anna's Quest: Volume 1 - Winfriede's Tower - Narrator
 Dust: An Elysian Tail - Oneida/FloHop
 EVE: DUST 514
 Forest Keeper
 Gothic Fiction: Dark Saga
 Heroes of Newerth - Phoenix Ra/Clockwork Archer
 Icebound - Bartender
 JAWS: Ultimate Predator
 Legion of the Damned
 Lemonade Standoff
 Life Is Strange 2 - Joan Marcus
 Little Zoologist
 Loren The Amazon Princess - Karen
 Malevolence: The Sword of Ahkranox - Female Hero/Elder God 
 Miner Wars 2081 - Various
 Octopath Traveler - Various
 Project D
 Retro Act: Rearmed
 Rite of Passage: The Perfect Show
 Shadow Wolf Mysteries 2: Bane of the Family
 Spirits of Mystery: The Dark Minotaur
 Wing Commander Saga - Jessica Wagner/Various Characters
 Witches' Legacy: The Charleston Curse
 Battlerite - Iva

References

External links
Official website

American film actresses
American television actresses
American voice actresses
Living people
Actresses from Los Angeles
Yale University alumni
21st-century American women
Year of birth missing (living people)